The Dornier Do 214 was a proposed large long-range flying boat, developed by Dornier in World War II.

Development 

Originally designed as the Do P.93 for passenger transatlantic service from Lisbon to New York, the Do 214 was redesigned as the P.192 for military service in early 1940. In 1941, a full-sized fuselage mockup was constructed in order to evaluate the interior layout. The fuselage was streamlined, having a round cross-section, with the interior consisting of two decks.
 
Its wings featured a small amount of sweep on the leading edge, with straight trailing edges, and were shoulder-mounted on the fuselage. Eight Daimler-Benz DB 613 24-cylinder "power-system" engines — themselves consisting of a pair of Daimler-Benz DB 603 inverted V12 engines, paired up to run a single propeller like the DB 605-based "DB 610" engines of the Heinkel He 177A, and themselves weighing over  apiece (the DB 613 "power systems" would have weighed more like 1.8 tonnes apiece) — provided the power, with four tractor engines and four pusher engines. All eight "power system"
engines, using a total of 16 DB 603s to complete them, provided power to two quartets of four-blade VDM variable-pitch propellers; the front propellers had a 5.00 m (16 ft 5 in) diameter, the rear propellers had a 4.60 m (15 ft 1 in) diameter.

The mammoth eight-engine design was intended for use as a military transport, with a large bow door admitting vehicles and bulky freight to the upper deck. It was also designed for use as a long-range bomber, flying tanker, aerial minelayer and U-boat supply vessel. By 1943, it was realized that long-range flying boats were not needed due to the worsening war situation, and the Do 214 project was canceled.

Göppingen Gö 8
A 1/5 scale model glider of the Dornier Do 214 was designed and built as the Göppingen Gö 8, by Wolf Hirth and Ulrich Hütter. For hydrodynamic stability tests of the hull integrated floats, in collaboration with the Göttingen aerodynamic laboratory, the glider was towed by a boat.

Specifications

The following specifications are for Do P.192-01 / Do 214 / civil airliner / DB 613C engines.

See also

References

 

Abandoned military aircraft projects of Germany
Do 214
German military transport aircraft
Flying boats
Eight-engined push-pull aircraft
High-wing aircraft